Harry Hartz (24 December 1896 – 26 September 1974) was an American auto mechanic and race car driver.

Career
Harry Hartz was born in Pomona, California, and grew up in the Los Angeles area. At age eighteen, he began to drive in support events for the car races of the time. He was a mechanic, but sought to be a race car driver and signed on with the Duesenberg brothers after World War I. Hartz made his debut at the 1921 Indianapolis 500 race as Eddie Hearne's riding mechanic.

The following year, Hartz was behind the wheel of the Duesenberg and finished in second place. In 1923, he finished in second place again in a Cliff Durant Special, and placed in fourth position next year. In 1925, he brought his own  Miller and finished fourth, and returned the next year with his  Miller Special to capture second place. His car had a mechanical failure in 1927. He is the only driver to come in second in the Indianapolis 500 three times, but never to win the race in his six attempts.

Hartz was successful in board track racing. He finished in the top five positions 46 times out of the 69 major events he started, and won seven championship events.

Hartz was badly burned and injured in a crash in 1927 at the Rockingham Speedway in Salem, New Hampshire, requiring him to spend the next two years in hospitals. The stock market crash of 1929 also inflicted heavy financial losses for him. He retired from racing to become a team owner and chief mechanic. Hartz bought a used 1927 Miller 91 front-drive race car, and built the car for the junk-formula by widening the chassis and installing a bored-out Miller 122 (151 cu in). Together with Billy Arnold as driver, the combination was successful, and they won the 1930 Indy 500 race and also took the national championship for the year.

Hartz appeared in the racing sequences for the 1932 movie The Crowd Roars.

Hartz worked for Studebaker for many years. After Chrysler began using auto racing as a promotional tool to sell its cars, in 1933 DeSoto recruited Hartz for a publicity stunt by driving a car backwards across the country. During mid-August 1934, he set 72 new AAA stock car records at the Bonneville Salt Flats course in Utah in a Chrysler Imperial Airflow coupe. Another source credits him with driving the newly introduced DeSoto Airflow  from New York to San Francisco, and averaging , with a total fuel bill of US$33.06 for the run. He also appeared at the 1933 Chicago World's Fair as a stunt driver at the Chrysler Exhibit.

After having much success, Hartz retired in 1940. Later, he had a serious automobile accident from which he never fully recovered. He died in Indianapolis, Indiana at age 77.

Awards
Hartz was inducted into the National Sprint Car Hall of Fame in 1998.

Indy 500 results

References
Inline

General
 
 
 
 
 
 
 Indy's unluckiest legends: Part 1 - Racer, Robin Miller, 20 May 2013

1896 births
1974 deaths
Champ Car champions
Indianapolis 500 drivers
Mechanics (people)
National Sprint Car Hall of Fame inductees
People from the San Gabriel Valley
Racing drivers from California
AAA Championship Car drivers